Deception in animals is the transmission of misinformation by one animal to another, of the same or different species, in a way that propagates beliefs that are not true. 

Mimicry and camouflage enable animals to appear to be other than they are. Prey animals may appear as predators, or vice versa; both predators and prey may be hard to see (crypsis), or may be mistaken for other objects (mimesis). In Batesian mimicry, harmless animals may appear to be distasteful or poisonous. In automimicry, animals may have eyespots in less important parts of the body than the head, helping to distract attack and increase the chance of survival.

In more active forms of anti-predator adaptation, animals may feign death when they detect a predator, or may quickly conceal themselves or take action to distract a predator, such as when a cephalopod releases ink. In deimatic behaviour, a harmless animal adopts a threatening pose or displays startling, brightly coloured parts of its body to startle a predator or rival.

Some animals may use tactical deception, with behaviour that is deployed in a way that other animals misinterpret what is happening to the advantage of the agent. Some of the evidence for this is anecdotal, but in the great apes in particular, experimental studies in ethology suggest that deception is actively practised by some animals.

Overview

Some types of deception in animals are completely involuntary (e.g. disruptive coloration), but others are under voluntary control and may involve an element of learning. Most instances of voluntary deception in animals involve a simple behaviour, such as a cat arching its back and raising its hackles, to make itself appear larger than normal when attacked. There are relatively few examples of animal behaviour which might be attributed to the manipulative type of deception which we know occurs in humans, i.e. "tactical deception". It has been argued that true deception assumes the deceiver knows that (1) other animals have minds, (2) different animals' minds can believe different things are true (when only one of these is actually true), and (3) it can make another mind believe that something false is actually true. True deception requires the deceiver to have the mental capacity to assess different representations of reality. Animal behaviour scientists are therefore wary of interpreting a single instance of behaviour as true deception, and explain it with simpler mental processes such as learned associations. In contrast, human activities such as military deception are certainly intentional, even when they involve methods such as camouflage which physically parallel camouflage methods used by animals.

Levels of deception in animals 

Mitchell lists four levels of deception in animals:

First-level deception: an animal acts because it cannot do otherwise, it is programmed to deceive in a certain way. For example, false eyeballs on animals, such as butterfly markings that indicate their heads are at the back end of their bodies as an aid to escape, or markings to make predators appear safe
Second-level deception: a programmed act of behavior when another organism is registered. Examples include a predator acting in a way to hide its predatory nature around prey
Third-level deception: involves learning, and is based upon trial and error. An example is feigned injury to get or divert attention; for example, a parent mockingbird feigning an injury to attract a predator away from its defenceless offspring
Fourth-level deception: includes recognition of other animals' beliefs, i.e., second-order thinking. This can be verbal deception such as a chimp misleading other chimps to hide a food source. 

All four levels are found in the biological world, including bacteria and plants, but the third level and fourth level seem to be exclusive to animals. If the same organism that deceives is also a deceiver, we are talking about self-deception. Cases of self-deception have been found in the animal world as well regarding dishonest behavior of slender crayfish (Cherax dispar).

One of the most common levels of deception is the first level of deception: mimicry is the similarity of one species to another which protects one or both species. This similarity can be in appearance, behaviour, sound, scent, and location, with the mimics found in similar places to their models. There are many forms of mimicry, and an individual example may fall into more than one of the recognised categories.

Defensive mimicry 
Defensive or protective mimicry takes place when organisms are able to avoid encounters that would be harmful to them by deceiving enemies by appearing to be something that they are not. For example, mantis shrimp typically spread their front limbs (known as "smashers") to threaten rivals in a behaviour called the "meral spread".  Newly moulted mantis shrimps frequently deceive potential competitors by spreading their front limbs, even though their still-soft exoskeletons meant that they could not use their smashers without damaging  themselves.

Batesian mimicry 

Batesian mimicry is a form of mimicry typified by a situation where a harmless species has evolved to imitate the warning signals of a harmful species directed at a common predator. The harmful species (the model) might have spines, stingers, or toxic chemistry, while its apparent double has no defence other than resembling the unpalatable species. Protection of the mimic from predators is afforded by its resemblance to the unpalatable species, which the predator associates with a certain appearance and a bad experience.

Examples of Batesian mimicry are the several species of butterflies that mimic the toxic Heliconid butterflies. Another butterfly mimic is the non-toxic great Mormon of Indonesia. Each female butterfly (regardless of her coloration) can produce one or more different female forms which mimic any of five other species of foul-tasting butterflies. Batesian mimicry is also found in the harmless milk snake, which mimics venomous coral snakes. Both snakes are marked with alternating yellow, red, and black bands, causing potential predators to avoid both. The snakes can often be distinguished by using an old saying: "Red against yellow: kill a fellow. red against black: friend to Jack." The deadly coral snake has bands in the order of red, yellow, black, while the innocuous species have the pattern of red, black, yellow (although there are exceptions).

Deception by Batesian mimicry need not be visual, as it may involve any of the senses. For example, some moths use a highly effective defence against bats. In response to hearing ultrasound emitted by hunting bats, they produce loud ultrasonic clicks to mimic the unpalatable tiger moth – a case of auditory Batesian mimicry.

Müllerian mimicry 

Müllerian mimicry occurs when two or more genuinely unprofitable species have come to mimic each other's warning signals, so unlike the case in Batesian mimicry, no deception is involved. Typically the species share one or more common predators, though they may or may not be closely related.

For example, the viceroy butterfly appears very similar to the noxious-tasting monarch butterfly. Although for a long time thought to be an example of Batesian mimicry, the viceroy has recently been discovered to be just as unpalatable as the monarch, making this a case of Müllerian mimicry. Poison dart frogs of South America and mantella frogs of Madagascar are examples of Müllerian mimicry, with their similar conspicuous warning coloration (bright colours against black markings) and toxic composition, since for geographic reasons there is no possibility for any potential predators to encounter both species.

Müllerian mimicry may also use any of the senses. For example, many snakes share the same auditory warning signals.

Aggressive mimicry 

Aggressive mimicry is the mimicking by predators or parasites of harmless species, allowing the predator to approach and sometimes to attract its prey.

Anglerfish are named for their characteristic method of predation. Anglerfish typically have at least one long filament (the illicium) sprouting from the middle of the head, protruding above the fish's eyes and terminating in an irregular growth of flesh (the esca) at the tip of the filament. The filament can move in all directions and the esca can be wiggled so as to resemble a prey animal, thus acting as bait to lure other predators close enough for the anglerfish to devour them. Some deep-sea anglerfishes of the bathypelagic zone emit light from their escas to attract prey. This bioluminescence is a result of symbiosis with bacteria.

Several turtle species and the frogmouth catfish have tongue extensions that lure prey to a position where they become an easy catch. In sal luring, the predator uses tail movements to attract prey. This form of mimicry is used by several snake and species,such as the spider-tailed horned viper which tail deceits a spider, thus attracting birds, tasselled wobbegong shark is as well an example.

In another example of aggressive mimicry, males are lured toward what seems to be a sexually receptive female, only to be eaten. For example, fireflies of the genus Photuris emit the same light signals that females of the genus Photinus emit as a mating signal.
 Male fireflies from several different genera are attracted to these "femmes fatales" because the predatory females can identify the male's species and emit the signal used by the female of the male's species.

Aggressive mimicry need not involve the sense of vision. For example, the assassin bug preys on spiders, entering their web and plucking its silk threads. This produces vibrations that match the pattern of vibrations made by typical prey caught in the web, causing the spider to approach.

Automimicry 

Automimicry refers to instances in which one body part of an animal mimics another. This may help and animal survive an attack, or help predators to appear innocuous.  Examples include many moth, butterfly, and fish species that have "eye-spots". These are large dark markings that help prey escape by causing predators to attack a false target.  For example, the gray hairstreak (Strymon melinus) shows the false head at its rear; it has a better chance of surviving an attack to that part than an attack to the head. Another example is the "two-headed" snake of Central Africa which has a tail that resembles a head. The snake even moves its tail in the way most snakes move their heads. This adaptation functions to deceive prey as to the source of an attack.

Camouflage 

Camouflage is the use of any combination of materials, coloration, or behaviour that helps to conceal an animal by making it hard to see (crypsis) or by disguising it as something else (mimesis).

Crypsis 

There are several methods of achieving crypsis. These include, resemblance to the surroundings,
disruptive coloration, eliminating shadow, self-decoration, cryptic behaviour, motion camouflage, changeable skin appearance, countershading, counter-illumination, transparency, and silvering to reflect the environment.

Many species are cryptically colored to resemble their surroundings. For example, Uroplatus geckos can be almost completely invisible, even to a nearby observer. Similarly, the katydids, a group of grasshopper-like insects found worldwide, are nocturnal and use their cryptic coloration to remain unnoticed during the day. They remain perfectly still, often in a position that increases the effectiveness of their camouflage.

Some animals have coloration which makes them highly conspicuous when outside their normal environment but highly cryptic when in it. For example, the blue morpho, a forest butterfly, has iridescent blue upper wings and a 17 cm wingspan. However, because the underwings are dark, when the morpho flies through the flickering light of the forest or even out in daylight, it seems to disappear. Other forest species, especially mammals, use disruptive coloration and have spotted or striped pelage which helps break up the animal's outline. In the shade created by trees or other foliage, even large mammals such as leopards, jaguars, ocelots, and okapi are difficult to see because of such disruptive coloration.

Underwater animals adopt a wide range of methods of camouflage including transparency, reflection, counter-illumination, countershading, and self-decoration. Fish are light on the bottom and dark on top to blend into the background when viewed from top or bottom.

Most forms of camouflage are less effective when the camouflaged animal moves because motion is easily seen by the observing predator or prey. However, insects such as hoverflies and dragonflies use motion camouflage: the hoverflies to approach possible mates, and the dragonflies to approach rivals when defending territories. Motion camouflage is achieved by moving so as to stay on a straight line between the target and a fixed point in the landscape; the pursuer thus deceives the target animal by appearing not to move but only to loom larger in the target's field of vision.

Mimesis 

Katydids have evolved a wide range of camouflage adaptations so their body colouring and shape match entire leaves, half-eaten leaves, dying leaves, leaves with bird droppings, sticks, twigs, and tree bark. Other well-known mimetic animals include beetles, mantids, caterpillars, moths, snakes, lizards, frogs, and fish.

A well known response of cephalopods when threatened is to release large volumes of ink. Some cephalopods also release pseudomorphs ("false bodies"); smaller clouds of ink with a greater mucus content, which allows them to hold their shape for longer. These are expelled slightly away from the cephalopod; they are roughly the same volume and look like the cephalopod that released them. Predators have often been seen attacking a pseudomorph, allowing the cephalopod to escape.

Active camouflage 

There are two mechanisms of active camouflage in animals: counter-illumination and colour change (sometimes called metachrosis).

In counter-illumination camouflage an animal produces light that causes it to blend in against a lit background. In water, light comes down from the surface, so when animals are seen from below, they appear darker than the background. Some species of cephalopod, such as the midwater squid and the sparkling enope squid, produce light in photophores on their undersides to match the background. Bioluminescence is common among marine animals, so counter-illumination camouflage may be a widespread mode of deception.

Colour change permits camouflage against different backgrounds. In the context of deception, this can be used as a defence or predatory strategy, or during courtship and mating. Colour change is made possible by chromatophores; pigment-containing and light-reflecting organelles in cells found in amphibians, fish, reptiles, crustaceans and cephalopods. Inside the chromatophore cell of cephalopods, pigment granules are enclosed in an elastic sac. To change colour, the animal distorts the sac by muscular contraction, changing its translucency, reflectivity or opacity. This differs from the mechanism used in fish, amphibians and reptiles, in that the shape of the sac is being changed rather than a translocation of pigment vesicles within the cell.

Some chameleon and anole species are able to voluntarily change their skin colours. Different chameleon species are able to change different colours which can include pink, blue, red, orange, green, black, brown, light blue, yellow, turquoise and purple. Some species, such as Smith's dwarf chameleon, adjust their colours for camouflage in accordance with the vision of the specific predator species (bird or snake) that they are being threatened by.

Some octopuses can use muscles in the skin to change both the colour and texture of their mantle to achieve a greater camouflage. In some species, the mantle can take on the spiky appearance of seaweed, or the scraggly, bumpy texture of a rock, among other disguises. A few species, such as the mimic octopus, have another defence mechanism. They can combine their highly flexible bodies with their colour-changing ability to accurately mimic other, more dangerous animals, such as lionfish, sea snakes, and eels.

Feigning death

A well-researched form of deception is feigning death, often referred to by non-specialists as "playing dead" or "playing possum", although specialists use the terms "tonic immobility" or "thanatosis". A wide range of animals, e.g. lizards, birds, rodents, and sharks, behave as if dead as an anti-predator adaptation, as predators usually take only live prey.

In beetles, artificial selection experiments have shown that there is heritable variation for length of death-feigning. Those selected for longer death-feigning durations are at a selective advantage to those at shorter durations when a predator is introduced. Birds often feign death to escape predation; for example tonic immobility in quail reduces the probability of attacks by cats.

Death feigning may also play a role in reproduction, for example, in the nursery web spider, the male sometimes feigns death to avoid getting eaten by females during mating. In some cases, death feigning is used by a predator. For example, the predatory cichlid Haplochromis livingstoni lies on its side on the bottom sediments until approached by scavengers attracted to what appears to be a dead fish, whereupon H. livingstoni abandons the pretence, rights itself and attacks the scavenger.

Death feigning behaviour can be deliberately induced by humans, a prominent example being the "hypnosis" of chickens or pigeons. For example, if a pigeon is grasped firmly, quickly inverted and held briefly on its back on a table, it often remains immobile for a minute or two. According to Gilman et al. the investigation of 'animal hypnosis' dates back to the year 1646 in a report by Kircher. It has been shown that the intensity and duration of death feigning is related to the intensity of fear prior to the feigning state being induced. This has been used to show that hens in cages are more fearful than those in pens, hens on the top tier of battery cages are more fearful than those on the lower levels, hens carried by hand are more fearful than hens carried on a mechanical conveyor, and hens undergoing longer transportation times are more fearful than those undergoing transport of a shorter duration.

Concealment 
Many animals hide from predators behind rocks, in holes, in brush, and in many other ways. Some actually carry around parts of the environment to use for that purpose. For example, at least four individual veined octopuses were seen retrieving discarded coconut shells, carrying them up to 20 meters, manipulating them, and then assembling them to use as shelter. . This may be the first known example of tool use in cephalopods.

Cephalopods also conceal themselves by releasing large amounts of dark ink when they are threatened. The ink obscures the vision of the threatening animal and allows the cephalopod to escape.

Distraction displays

Distraction displays, also known as deflection displays and diversionary displays, are behaviours that draw the attention of a predator away from an object, typically the nest or young. These are well known in birds, but also occur in fish. A familiar example is the broken-wing display seen in nesting waders, plovers and doves such as the mourning dove. In this display, a bird walks away from its nest with one wing dragging on the ground. It seems to be an easy target, thus distracting the predator's attention away from the nest. Once the bird is far enough away it "recovers" and quickly flies off.

Deimatic displays 

A deimatic displays is a pattern of threatening or startling behaviour, such as suddenly displaying conspicuous eyespots, used to scare off or momentarily distract a predator, thus giving the prey animal an opportunity to escape. For example, some moths look threatening while at rest by displaying a sinister lurking face, such as those of genus Speiredonia, or the more aggressive face of a snake poised to attack, such as many species of genus Spirama. Adult Atlas moths of the genera Attacus and Rothschildia also display snake heads. The eyed hawkmoth displays its large eyespots on its wings and moves them slowly as if it were a vertebrate predator such as an owl.

Tactical deception 
Tactical deception (also referred to as functional deception) is the use of signals or displays from an animal's normal repertoire to mislead or deceive another individual. Some researchers limit the use of this term to an intraspecific behaviour, meaning that it occurs between members of the same species. Most other kinds of deception are meant to fool members of a different species. Tactical deception can also be achieved when the deceiver withholds information by failing to perform an expected action, such as giving a warning call when danger is observed.

Tactical deception can be costly to the user, because it occurs mostly in social animals that may lose trust in a group-member when that member's deceit is discovered. Indeed, a notable view in ethology is that animal displays are usually accurate signals, and that widespread deception cannot become a stable feature of a communication system. In this view, widespread use of deception would cause communication to break down, as the recipients of false signals would become "skeptical" about signal validity in general and fail to respond appropriately. However, as exemplified below, limited use of deception does seem to be a stable feature in various communities.

It is unclear what cognitive abilities are necessary for an animal to exhibit tactical deception. It might require the ability to understand another animal's point of view, or it might require only the use of specialized learned behaviours. These alternatives are hotly debated, and the answer tends to vary depending on the species being observed. In the first scenario, the deceiver would need a Theory of Mind which is the ability to attribute mental states (beliefs, knowledge, intents, desires, etc.) to another individual, The alternative view denies the need for such a capacity, but it does suggest the evolution of specialized brain functions responsible for social learning.

Tactical deception has been used as a measure of advanced social cognition as it relates to brain function.  Primates have larger brains, relative to body size, than in any other mammal except for dolphins, and this size difference is mainly due to an enlarged neocortex. Research has suggested that the evolution of the primate brain is selected-for in highly social species. One study used 18 species with varying brain volumes (three strepsirrhines, four New World monkeys, seven Old World monkeys, and four ape species). The study used the frequency of tactical deception as a measure of social cognition, and it found a strong correlation between the use of social deception and size of the neocortex.

Among cephalopods, some colour changes in cuttlefish might be called tactical deception, as these fish sometimes present entirely different displays to two different observers. When a male cuttlefish courts a female in the presence of other males, he displays a male pattern facing the female (courtship), and a female pattern facing away, to deceive other males.

In domestic pigs, in a setting where the behavior of a trained animal could reveal the source of food to another animal, the trained animal spent longer at the food source before other pigs arrived.

In an anecdotal account, Simmons reported that a female marsh harrier courted a male to obtain access to food he had stored. She then took this food and fed it to chicks that had been fathered by another male. More extensive studies focused on possibly deceitful behaviour in the pied flycatcher, a species in which males may possess more than one territory. Females gain from mating with a male that has no other mates and males may try to deceive females about their mating status (mated or unmated). Females frequently visit the male, and if he is always alone on his territory he is probably unmated. Thus, by repeated sampling of male behaviour, females are usually able to avoid mating with previously mated males.

Group-foraging common ravens hoard their food in a number of places, and also raid the caches made by others. Cachers withdraw from conspecifics when hiding their food and usually place their caches behind structures, out of sight of potential observers. Raiders remain inconspicuous, keeping at a distance from cachers near their cache sites, but within sight. In response, cachers often interrupt caching, change cache sites, or empty their caches. These behaviours suggest that ravens can withhold information about their intentions, which may qualify as tactical deception. Similarly, if a Eurasian jay (Garrulus glandarius) is being watched by another jay, it tends to cache food behind an opaque barrier rather than a transparent barrier, apparently to reduce the likelihood of other jays pilfering their caches.

Observations on great apes have been widely reported as evidence of tactical deception. Several great apes have been trained to use sign language, and in some instances these animals seem to have used language in an attempt to deceive human observers. Koko, a female gorilla, was trained to use a form of American Sign Language.  It has been claimed that she once tore a steel sink out of its moorings and when her handlers confronted her, Koko signed "cat did it" and pointed at her innocent pet kitten. Nim Chimpsky was a common chimpanzee also trained in American Sign Language. In a documentary about the chimp ("Project Nim") trainers claimed that when Nim got bored of learning to sign words she would sign 'dirty' indicating she wanted to go to the toilet, which caused the trainer to stop the lesson.

Another example involves a chimpanzee that was approached from behind by a loud aggressive rival. Here, the chimpanzee moved his lips until he lost his  fear grin thereby concealing his fear. Only then did he turn around to face the challenger.

Deceit in great apes has been studied under experimental conditions, one of which is summarised by Kirkpatrick:
"...food was hidden and only one individual, named Belle, in a group of chimpanzees was informed of the location. Belle was eager to lead the group to the food but when one chimpanzee, named Rock, began to refuse to share the food, Belle changed her behaviour. She began to sit on the food until Rock was far away, then she would uncover it quickly and eat it. Rock figured this out though and began to push her out of the way and take the food from under her. Belle then sat farther and farther away waiting for Rock to look away before she moved towards the food. In an attempt to speed the process up, Rock looked away until Belle began to run for the food. On several occasions he would even walk away, acting disinterested, and then suddenly spin around and run towards Belle just as she uncovered the food."

Deceptive behaviour has been observed in Old World monkeys including baboons (Papio ursinus). In one of their articles, Byrne and Whiten recorded observations of "intimate tactical deception" within a group of baboons, and documented examples that they classified as follows: A juvenile using warning screams to gain access to underground food storages which otherwise would have been inaccessible; an exaggerated "looking" gesture (which in an honest context would mean detection of a predator) produced by a juvenile to avoid attack by an adult male; recruitment of a "fall-guy" (a third party used by the deceiver to draw attention or aggression); and using one's own movement pattern to draw group-mates away from food caches. Byrne and Whiten also broke these categories into subcategories denoting the modality of the action (e.g. vocalization) and what the action would have signified if observed in an honest context. They noted whether the individual that had been manipulated was in turn used to manipulate others, what the costs had been to the manipulated individual, and whether or not there were additional costs to third parties. Byrne and Whiten expressed concern that these observations might be exceptions, and that such deceptive behaviors might not be common to the species.

Among New World monkeys, Tufted capuchin (Cebus apella) monkey subordinates have been found to employ a vocal form of tactical deception when competing with dominant monkeys over valuable food resources. They use alarm calls normally reserved for predator sightings— either barks (used specifically for aerial stimuli), peeps, or hiccups— to elicit a response in fellow group members and then take advantage of the distraction to pilfer food. In a series of experiments directed by Brandon Wheeler a group of tufted capuchin monkeys was provided with bananas on feeding platforms. Here, subordinate monkeys made nearly all of the alarm calls that could be classified as "false", and in many of the false alarms, the caller was on or within two meters of the feeding platform. The calls made dominant monkeys leave the platform while the subordinate caller stayed behind to eat.

Costs of tactical deception 
Withholding information, a form of tactical deception, can be costly to the deceiver. For example, rhesus monkeys discovering food announce their discoveries by calling on 45% of occasions. Discoverers who fail to call, but are detected with food by other group members, receive significantly more aggression than vocal discoverers. Moreover, silent female discoverers eat significantly less food than vocal females. Presumably because of such costs to deceivers, tactical deception occurs rather rarely. It is thought to be more common in forms and species where the cost of ignoring the possibly deceptive act is even higher than the cost of believing. For example, tufted capuchin monkeys sometimes emit false alarm calls. The cost of ignoring one of these calls could be death, which may lead to a "better safe than sorry" philosophy even when the caller is a known deceiver.

See also 
 Animal communication
 List of camouflage methods
 Military deception
Mimicry in plants

References

Further reading 

Animal communication
Ethology
Camouflage
Deception
Mimicry